Phtheochroa reisseri is a species of moth of the family Tortricidae. It is found on Crete.

The wingspan is 12–14 mm. Adults have been recorded on wing in May.

References

Moths described in 1970
Phtheochroa